Shanghai Stadium is a station on Line 4 of the Shanghai Metro. Service began at this station on 31 December 2005.

Name 
The name of the station "" (literally Shanghai Sports Field) refers to nearby Shanghai Stadium. As the adjacent Line 1/Line 4 transfer station used to use this English name, that station is now translated as Shanghai Indoor Stadium. Still, confusion remains due to the similarity of the names in both English and Chinese, only differing by one word/character, and referring to facilities located in close vicinity.

Nearby locations 

 Shanghai Stadium
 Shanghai Indoor Stadium
 Sightseeing bus station, with shuttle buses to Sheshan Forest Park and other destinations
 Longhua Hospital
 Shanghai Mental Health Center

References 

Shanghai Metro stations in Xuhui District
Line 4, Shanghai Metro
Railway stations in China opened in 2005
Railway stations in Shanghai